Exmes  is a former commune in the Orne department in north-western France. On 1 January 2017, it was merged into the new commune Gouffern en Auge. It was the seat of the county of Hiémois (French: Comté d'Hiémois), granted before his death in 1027 by Richard II, Duke of Normandy to his younger son, Robert, who eventually succeeded as duke of Normandy. In 1136, Gilbert de Clare, Earl of Pembroke led an expedition against Exmes and burned parts of the town, including the church of Notre Dame.

Herbert de Losinga, Bishop of Norwich (c. 1095–1119) was born in Exmes as well as François Le Prévost d'Exmes (1729–1793), 18th-century playwright.

Heraldry

See also
 Communes of the Orne department

References

Former communes of Orne